was a feudal domain under the Tokugawa shogunate of Edo period Japan, located in Tanba Province in what is now the west-central portion of modern-day Hyōgo Prefecture. It was centered initially around Sasayama Castle in what is now the city of Tamba-Sasayama.

History
The Sasayama area is a strategic junction of highways from Kyoto to both the San'in region, and the San'yo regions of western Japan. Recognizing the importance of this location, after the Battle of Sekigahara, Tokugawa Ieyasu ordered the construction of Sasayama Castle to isolate Toyotomi Hideyori at Osaka Castle from the powerful feudal lords of western Japan, many of whom still had pro-Toyotomi loyalties. In 1608, he appointed Matsudaira Yasushige, who was possibly his illegitimate son, to oversee construction, and as daimyō of the new 50,000 koku Sasayama Domain. The design of the castle was done by Tōdō Takatora, construction overseen by Ikeda Terumasa and the materials and labor provided by the Fukushima, Kato clan, Hachisuka clan and Asano clan.  Matsudaira Yasushige was transferred to Kishiwada Domain in 1619. He was replaced by Matsudaira Yoshimichi from another cadet branch of the Matsudaira clan, the Fujii-Matsudaira. He was the son of Tokugawa Ieyasu's half-sister. His son Matsudaira Tadakuni was overseer of the attainder of Murakami Domain and Fukuchiyama Domains, and also conducted land surveys, expanded the castle town and built numerous shrines and temples before he was transferred to Akashi Domain in 1649. 

Matsudaira Yasunobu, from the Katahara-Matsudaira became daimyō, and his cadet branch of the Matsudaira clan ruled until their transfer to Tanba-Kameyama Domain in 1748. The 4th daimyō, Matsudaira Nobutsuna served as Kyoto Shoshidai and rōjū and invited cultural figures to the domain. However, his son, Matsudaira Nobumine, was a poor ruler and was injured during peasant uprisings in the Kyōhō famine. The shogunate ordered him to trade places with Aoyama Tadatomo of Tanba-Kameyama Domain in 1748.

The Aoyama would rule the domain until the Meiji restoration. Aoyama Tadatomo served as Jisha-bugyō and Osaka jōdai in the shogunal administration. His successor, Aoyama Tadataka invited Confucian scholars to the domain, and built a han school, the "Shintokudo", which was later expanded by the 4th daimyō, Aoyama Tadahiro. He also served as Jisha-bugyō, Kyoto Shoshidai and Osaka jōdai in the shogunal administration. His son, Aoyama Tadanaga was a  Jisha-bugyō and rōjū. On the other hand, due to poor harvests, peasant rebellions frequently occurred. The domain had little economic production other than rice cultivation, and as a result, the clan's finances and territories were often in dire straits. The domain made laws to prevent peasants from fleeing their lands; however, Aoyama Tadahiro was forced to relax these regulations to allow peasants to work in Settsu Province in the winter months as migrant workers in the sake industry. He also invited potters from Kyoto to the domain in an attempt to start a ceramics industry. Nevertheless, due to new taxes frequently imposed for financial reconstruction, over 20 peasant uprisings occurred. By the end of the domain, its debt was estimated at 281,329 ryō.

During the Bakumatsu period, as with almost all domains, the samurai of Sasayama were divided between pro-Tokugawa and pro-sonnō-jōi factions, although the domain itself was regarded as one of the most loyal of the fudai houses the final daimyō, Aoyama Takayuki, served as guard of Nijō Castle in Kyoto and led shogunate forces in the Kinmon Incident. However, after the start of the Boshin War, when Saionji Kinmochi led an imperial army to Sasayama, the domain surrendered without a fight. Aoyama Tadayuki became imperial governor in 1869. In 1871, with the abolition of the han system, Sasayama briefly became "Sasayama Prefecture", which was merged with "Toyooka Prefecture" a few months later,  before becoming part of Hyogo Prefecture on August 21, 1876.

Holdings at the end of the Edo period
As with most domains in the han system, Sasayama Domain consisted of several discontinuous territories calculated to provide the assigned kokudaka, based on periodic cadastral surveys and projected agricultural yields. 

Tanba Province 
104 villages in Taki District (entire district)
56 villages in Kuwada District 
12 villages in Funai District 
4 villages in Ikaruga District 
2 villages in Amata District 
Tajima Province
 16 villages in Asago District
Settsu Province
3 villages in Muko District
Tōtōmi Province
10 villages in Haibara District
14 villages in Kitō District

List of daimyō 

{| class=wikitable
! #||Name || Tenure || Courtesy title || Court Rank || kokudaka
|-
|colspan=6|  Matsui-Matsudaira clan, 1608-1619 (fudai)
|-
||1||||1608 – 1619||Suo-no-kami (周防守)|| Junior 4th Rank, Lower Grade (従四位下)||50,000 koku
|-
|colspan=6|  Fujii-Matsudaira clan, 1619-1649 (fudai)
|-
||1||||1619 – 1620||Izu-no-kami (伊豆守)|| Junior 5th Rank, Lower Grade (従五位下)||50,000 koku
|-
||2||||1620 – 1649||Yamashiro-no-kami (山城守)|| Junior 5th Rank, Lower Grade (従五位下)||50,000 koku
|-
|colspan=6|   Katahara-Matsudaira clan, 1649-1748 (fudai))
|-
||1||||1649 – 1669||Wakasa-no-kami (若狭守)|| Junior 4th Rank, Lower Grade (従四位下)||50,000 koku
|-
||2||||1669 – 1672||Suruga-no-kami (駿河守)|| Junior 5th Rank, Lower Grade (従五位下)||50,000 koku
|-
||3||||1672 – 1676||Shuzen-no-kami (主膳正)|| Junior 5th Rank, Lower Grade (従五位下)||50,000 koku
|-
||4||||1677 – 1717||Kii-no-kami (紀伊守); Jijū (侍従)|| Junior 4th Rank, Lower Grade (従四位下)||50,000 koku
|-
||5||||1717 – 1748||Kii-no-kami (紀伊守)|| Junior 4th Rank, Lower Grade (従四位下)||50,000 koku
|-
|colspan=6|  Aoyama clan, 1748-1871 (fudai))
|-
||1||||1748 – 1760||Inaba-no-kami (因幡守 )|| Junior 4th Rank, Lower Grade (従四位下)||50,000 koku
|-
||2||||1760 – 1781||Shimotsuke-no-kami (下野守 )|| Junior 5th Rank, Lower Grade (従五位下)||50,000 koku
|-
||3||||1781 – 1785||Hoki-no-kami (伯耆守 )|| Junior 5th Rank, Lower Grade (従五位下)||50,000 koku
|-
|4||||1785 – 1835||Shimotsuke-no-kami (下野守)|| Junior 4th Rank, Lower Grade (従四位下)||50,000 -> 60,000 koku
|-
|5||||1835 – 1862||Shimotsuke-no-kami (下野守)|| Junior 4th Rank, Lower Grade (従四位下)||60,000 koku
|-
|6||||1862 – 1871|||Inaba-no-kami (因幡守), Sakyo-no-daibu (左京大夫)|| Junior 4th Rank, Lower Grade (従四位下)||60,000 koku
|-
|}

See also 
 List of Han
 Abolition of the han system

Further reading
 Bolitho, Harold. (1974). Treasures Among Men: The Fudai Daimyo in Tokugawa Japan. New Haven: Yale University Press.  ;  OCLC 185685588
 Genealogy of the Aoyama clan 
 Japan Gazette (1912). Peerage of Japan. n.p.
 Papinot, Edmond (1972). Historical and Geographical Dictionary of Japan. Vermont: Tuttle.
 Tsukahira, Toshio George (1966). Feudal Control in Tokugawa Japan: The Sankin Kōtai System. Boston: Harvard University Press.

References

Domains of Japan
1608 establishments in Japan
States and territories established in 1608
1871 disestablishments in Japan
States and territories disestablished in 1871
Tanba Province
History of Hyōgo Prefecture
Fujii-Matsudaira clan
Matsudaira clan
Matsui-Matsudaira clan